Maulévrier is a commune in the Maine-et-Loire department in western France.

Points of interest
Parc Oriental de Maulévrier which is the biggest Japanese garden in France

See also
Communes of the Maine-et-Loire department

References

Communes of Maine-et-Loire